Håkan Lidbo (born 20 July 1965) is a Swedish music producer, primarily active in electronica, but also other genres. He has published over 350 records on a variety of record labels, is the editor of the radio show Power and operates Volt Festival in Uppsala.
He is also behind the music project Pay TV that participated in the Swedish Eurovision Song Contest twice.

Lidbo was born in Malmö, Sweden.

References

External links

Living people
1965 births
Swedish record producers